Dingo is a 1991 Australian film directed by Rolf de Heer and written by Marc Rosenberg. It is notable for marking Miles Davis' first and only speaking role in a narrative feature film.

Synopsis
The story traces the pilgrimage of John Anderson, an average guy with a passion for jazz, from his home in outback Western Australia to the jazz clubs of Paris, to meet his idol, jazz trumpeter Billy Cross. In the film's opening sequence, Cross and his band unexpectedly land on a remote airstrip for repairs in the Australian outback and proceed to perform for the stunned locals.

Cast
Colin Friels - John Anderson 
Miles Davis - Billy Cross 
Helen Buday - Jane Anderson 
Joe Petruzzi - Peter 
Brigitte Catillon - Beatrice Boulain 
Bernard Fresson - Jacques Boulain 
Bernadette Lafont - Angie Cross
Helen Doig - Ruth

Production
The movie was filmed in Meekatharra, Perth, and Sandstone, Western Australia, as well as Paris, France.

Christian Faure was the assistant director of the movie.

Music

Davis, who plays the role of Cross, provided the film's soundtrack in cooperation with Michel Legrand.

Box office

Dingo grossed $132,500 at the box office in Australia.

Reception
According to Ozmovies:
Despite the presence of Miles Davis, the film also didn’t travel well internationally and struggled for attention, though his presence also has ensured the film’s ongoing status as a cult item, offsetting the unfulfilled award, critical and commercial hopes... ... the film was at the time criticised for being an unrealistic and unlikely romantic fairy tale, but jazz enthusiasts defensively rushed to dig out stories of Australia’s best jazz saxophonist, Bernie McGann, who, while working as a postman, went out into the bush to practise.

Home media
Dingo was released on DVD by Umbrella Entertainment in July 2005. The DVD is compatible with all region codes and includes special features such as a new 5.1 channel soundtrack, trailers, and an image gallery.

Umbrella Entertainment released a Region B Blu-ray of Dingo in 2021, with extra features including interviews with Rolf de Heer and Helen Buday and a rushes reel with audio commentary by Rolf de Heer.

See also
 Cinema of Australia
 South Australian Film Corporation

References

External links

Dingo at the National Film and Sound Archive
Dingo at Ozmovies

1991 films
1990s musical drama films
Australian musical drama films
French musical drama films
Films directed by Rolf de Heer
Films scored by Michel Legrand
Films scored by Miles Davis
Films shot in Australia
Miles Davis
1991 drama films
1990s English-language films
1990s French films